The 2006 Halton Borough Council election took place on 4 May 2006 to elect members of Halton Unitary Council in Cheshire, England. One third of the council was up for election and the Labour party stayed in overall control of the council.

After the election, the composition of the council was
Labour 35
Liberal Democrat 13
Conservative 8

Campaign
18 seats were contested in the election with only Beechwood, Daresbury and Windmill Hill wards not having elections. Labour were defending 12 of the seats, including the seat of the current mayor Peter Lloyd-Jones, and needed to keep 7 to retain control of the council. In total there were 56 candidates, 18 each from Labour and the Conservatives, 11 Liberal Democrats, 4 Green party, 2 Citizens Party of Halton, 2 independents and 1 from the British National Party.

Labour defended their record in control of the council saying that they had the third lowest council tax rate in North West England and were regenerating the area.

Results
The results saw Labour retain control of the council after holding 11 of the 12 seats they had been defending and gaining one from the Liberal Democrats. However the Labour mayor, Peter Lloyd-Jones, lost his seat to the Conservatives in Ditton ward by 29 votes. Lloyd-Jones considered making a legal challenge to the results as exactly 29 ballots had been spoiled and he said there were "irregularities at the opening of the Hale Bank polling station". Overall turnout in the election was 26.02%.

Ward results

References

2006 English local elections
2006
2000s in Cheshire